Ski Lift International (SLI) was an aerial lift manufacturer based out of Incline Village, Nevada.  SLI was established in 1965 by co-founders Samuel G. Bonasso and Joseph Sugarman, with Bonasso as its first president. The company built 46 lifts, mainly double chairlifts, from 1965 until 1973.  SLI had a prototype gondola and triple chair, but it is unlikely that these designs were ever used.  SLI chairlifts can still be seen at ski areas such as Catamount Ski Area. The company was known for inventing the first maintenance-free bail chair, well before competitors such as Riblet or Hall.  SLI shipped pre-welded towers and terminal parts to the ski areas, avoiding welding on site.  SLI was purchased by Riblet Tramway Company in 1973. Since then more and more of these lifts have been removed due to mechanical failures or the need for higher capacity. These lifts are currently very rare and are still rapidly disappearing from the earth.

List of SLI lifts still standing 

Alpine Slide-Big Bear Lake, California    double

Bryce Resort, Virginia	A	Double

Sapphire Valley, North Carolina	A Lift	Double

Bryce Resort, Virginia	B	Double

Diamond Peak, Nevada	Ridge	Double

Iron Mountain, California (CLOSED) - Chair 1 (Double)

Iron Mountain, California (CLOSED) - Chair 2 (Double)

June Mountain, California	4	Double

June Mountain, California	2	Double

Aspen Mountain, Colorado	Shadow Mountain	Double

Wolf Ridge, North Carolina	A	Double

Telluride, Colorado	7 Coonskin	Double

Telluride, Colorado	Oak Street	Double

49 Degrees North, Washington	2 Grubstake	Double

49 Degrees North, Washington	3 Payday	Double

Teton Pass, Montana	Chairlift	Double

Bighorn, Wyoming	Beginner	Double

Heavenly, Nevada        World Cup Double

Wolf Creek, Colorado	Nova	Double

Blacktail Mountain, MT  Crystal Double (former C-5 at Crystal Mountain, WA)

Ober Gatlinburg, TN	Blue	Double

Mountain Run, Virginia (CLOSED) - Double

References

Aerial lift manufacturers
American companies established in 1965
Companies disestablished in 1973